Eranthemum roseum, also known as blue eranthemum, rosy eranthemum (Marathi: dasmuli, दसमुळी; jangali aboli, जंगली अबोली ) is a native of the Western Ghats of India. The plant has tuberous roots, and grows to a height of ten in numbers, hence the local name, dasmuli.

References

Acanthaceae